Wolfgang Benkert (born 1 July 1951) is a German former footballer.

The goalkeeper played 269 East German top-flight matches.

In 1984 Benkert won his only cap for the East Germany national team in a friendly match against Greece.

References

External links
 
 
 

1951 births
Living people
German footballers
East German footballers
East Germany international footballers
FC Carl Zeiss Jena players
FC Rot-Weiß Erfurt players
FSV Zwickau players
Wuppertaler SV players
Sportspeople from Weimar
Footballers from Thuringia
Association football goalkeepers